Garsten Abbey is a former Benedictine monastery located in Garsten near Steyr in Upper Austria. Since 1851, the former monastery buildings have accommodated a prison.

History
The abbey was founded in 1080–1082 by Ottokar II of Styria as a community of secular canons and as a dynastic burial place for his family. Together with his fortress, the Styraburg (Schloss Lemberg), it served as a focal point of Ottokar as ruler of the Traungau, and was endowed with significant possessions in the Traisen and Gölsen valleys, in Lower Austria, probably from the dowry of Ottokar's wife Elisabeth, daughter of the Babenberger Leopold II of Austria. 

In 1107–1108 the monastery was made a priory of the Benedictine Göttweig Abbey; and became an independent abbey in 1110–1111. Its first and greatest abbot was Blessed Berthold of Garsten (d. 1142), a champion of the Hirsau Reforms, who is buried in the abbey church, and who built the abbey up to such a level that for centuries it was the religious, spiritual and cultural centre of the Eisenwurzen region. Monks from Garsten settled Gleink Abbey in the 1120s.

From 1625 Garsten Abbey was a member of the Benedictine Austrian Congregation.

In 1787 it was dissolved by Emperor Joseph II.

Abbey church

The abbey church still survives as a parish church. It was built by the Carlone family of master builders and is considered one of the most beautiful examples of High Baroque architecture in Austria. The church was designed by Pietro Francesco Carlone using the Jesuit church in Linz as a model, and finished by his sons Carlo Antonio and Giovanni Battista, it was said to have one of the most magnificent interiors of the late Austro-Italian Baroque.

Particularly notable are the stucco work and the Dutch tapestries. The Losenstein chapel, the sacristy and the summer choir are also of special interest.

A Christmas market is held in the "Am Platzl" Square in front of the abbey church in late November and early December.

Theatre
Garsten, like several other Benedictine monasteries in Austria, contained a theatre. It was dismantled and moved to Steyr in 1789, where it was reassembled in the former church of the Celestine nuns, whose community had also been dissolved, as the town theatre, which operated until 1958. The building, still known as the Altes Stadttheater, is now a music school.

Prison
Since 1850 the former monastery buildings have accommodated a prison, Justizanstalt Garsten. This is one of the few prisons in Austria where life sentences are carried out.  Austrian incest-rapist Josef Fritzl is serving his sentence there.

References

Further reading
 Heinz Dopsch: Die steirischen Otakare Zu ihrer Herkunft und ihren dynastischen Verbindungen. In: Gerhard Pferschy (ed.): Das Werden der Steiermark. Die Zeit der Traungauer. Festschrift zur 800. Wiederkehr der Erhebung zum Herzogtum. Verlag Styria, Graz u. a. 1980  (Veröffentlichungen des Steiermärkischen Landesarchives, Band 10), pp. 75–139
 Siegfried Haider: Studien zu den Traditionsbüchern des Klosters Garsten (= Mitteilungen des Instituts für Österreichische Geschichtsforschung. Ergänzungsband 52). Oldenbourg, München 2008 
 Siegfried Haider (ed.): Die Traditionsurkunden des Klosters Garsten. Kritische Edition (= Quelleneditionen des Instituts für Österreichische Geschichtsforschung. Band 8). Böhlau, Wien 2011 
 Siegfried Haider: Zur Garstener Äbtereihe im 12. Jahrhundert. In: Jahrbuch des Oberösterreichischen Musealvereines. Band 149a, Linz 2005, pp. 309–326 (online (PDF) on ZOBODAT).
 Karl Krendl: „... und verlobten sich hierher“. Wallfahrten im ehemaligen Stift Garsten und seinen Pfarren. Linz 2011 
 Franz Xaver Pritz: Geschichte der ehemaligen Benediktiner-Klöster Garsten und Gleink, im Lande ob der Enns, und der dazu gehörigen Pfarren. Haslinger, 1841 (Google eBook)
 Historische Landeskommission für Steiermark, Institut für Geschichte – Karl-Franzens-Universität Graz (publ.): Urkundenbuch der Steiermark. Band I Von den Anfängen bis 1192. (Garsten, GA5, Index der Dokumente)
 Gottfried Edmund Frieß: Geschichte des Benedictiner-Stiftes Garsten in Ober-Oesterreich. In: StMBO III/2, 1882, pp. 241–248
 Wolfgang Huber, Huberta Weigl (ed.): Jakob Prandtauer (1660–1726). Planen und Bauen im Dienst der Kirche. Exhibition catalogue, St. Pölten 2010, pp. 115–120

Churches in Austria
Prisons in Austria
Benedictine monasteries in Austria
1080 establishments in Europe
Christian monasteries established in the 11th century
Monasteries in Upper Austria